The Gorce Mountains are part of the Western Beskids mountain range spreading across southernmost Poland.

The south-eastern ridge of the Gorce reaches the Pieniny range (cut off by the Ochotnica pass), with Lubań as its tallest peak followed by Pasterski Wierch, Runek and Marszałek. The north-west ridges include Obidowiec, and the peak of Suhora (1,000 m (3,300 ft)) featuring an astronomical observatory owned and operated by the Pedagogical University of Kraków.

There are a number of smaller caves in the Gorce, carved out in sedimentary rock and its conglomerates which form the Carpathian Flysch Belt. High annual rainfall is caused by the air forced up by the mountains and accumulating into clouds. Other rivers, formed by the mountains include the Kamienica ( in length), the Ochotnica and the Porębianka, as well as large streams such as the Turbacz, the Gorcowy and the Łopuszna among others. The main city is Nowy Targ on the Dunajec below in the valley of Podhale, with large recreational villages including Krościenko nad Dunajcem, Szczawa and Ochotnica.

Geography

Wildlife include almost 50 mammal species, with wolf and lynx at the top; less frequent brown bear, and lutra (rare European otter), as well as marten and badger often found digging under pasture fields. The Hazel and the Forest dormouse along with the Edible dormouse are all strictly protected. There are over 200 Red deer counted in the park area, as well as Roe deer and Wild boar, fox, wildcat, hare, skunk, and stoat (the ermine). Reptiles and amphibians include the fire salamander (the only amphibian (one of two Salamandridae) that give birth to fully formed offspring at high elevations; the symbol of the Park), as well as over ninety species of breeding birds including owl, eagle, hawk, grouse, black stork and others.

In the Gorce, there are hundreds of species of plants, including Alpine and Subalpine plants, which grow in meadows and open areas. Forests cover about 65% of the mountains, in four distinct levels according to elevation. The most common species of trees are beech, spruce and fir, with the average age of up to 100 years.

The Gorce landscape has been altered by human activity. Early settlers appeared in the Gorce area in the 12th century. The first monastery was erected in Ludźmierz by Cistercian monks in 1234. During the reign of Casimir III the Great (Kazimierz Wielki) the first castles were built, including in Czorsztyn, and more new settlements, such as the town of Krościenko (1348) and villages: Kluszkowce (1307), Grywałd (1330), and Tylmanowa (1336), were established along the border with the Kingdom of Hungary, followed by increased commercial logging and transport. However, the Gorce forests suffered most in the 19th century during the imperial rule of Austria-Hungary. Trees were cut on a large scale, especially in easily accessible areas.

Notably, the colors of trail blazes (signs, installed by PTTK for hikers and skiers alike) do not imply levels of difficulty, but rather primary and secondary trails with different length and orientation, for example: the red and blue colors signify trails in east-west and north-south directions, while shortest loops generally use yellow blazes.

  Red, the longest trail, traversing the entire range: from easternmost Krościenko nad Dunajcem, to Rabka-Zdrój at its western end.
  Blue trails, from Snozka Pass (Przełęcz Snozka) in the south, to Kamienica (north). 
  Green trails, from Tylmanowa, Niedźwiedź, Nowy Targ (district capital) across the highest peaks (Turbacz, Lubań). 
  Yellow trails, from Ochotnica Górna, Poręba Wielka, Raba Niżna to PTTK mountain chalets usually.
  Black trails; from Szczawa, Lubomierz, Łopuszna, Mszana Dolna, Rabka-Zdrój across various meadows and passes.

See also
Geography of Poland
Tourism in Poland

Notes and references

External links

 The relief map of Gorce, marked with tourist trails and approximate walking time, published by Mapy górskie, 2012. Retrieved 
 Interactive map of the Gorce Mountains, with exact elevations, mountain passes, and the location of astronomical observatory; published by Wydawnictwo Compass, Poland. Retrieved 
 Road-map of Gorce region with names of settlements and lakes, published by Pieniny.com in collaboration with European Union Agricultural Development Fund LEADER, 2007-2013. Retrieved 
 High zoom map of Gorce National Park, with the location of every single peak and names of all forests and streams, published by the Gorce National Park (Gorczański Park Narodowy), 2012. Retrieved 
 Selection of smaller maps of walking, biking, skiing, and horse-riding trails in the Park, with an introduction to levels of difficulty by Krystyna Popko - Tomasiewicz, published by Gorczański Park Narodowy. Retrieved 
 Selection of 9 interactive maps of Beskids (including Gorce Mountains as well as Bieszczady), digitized from Mapa turystyczna Gorce published by Wydawnictwo "Sygnatura", Polkart. Retrieved  (courtesy of Maps online e-Gory.pl).
 East Carpathians Biosphere Reserve by UNESCO at MAB Biosphere Reserves Directory. Retrieved January 10, 2013.

Mountain ranges of Poland
National parks of Poland
Parks in Lesser Poland Voivodeship
Articles containing video clips